Nong (also known as Nang-e Pā’īn and Nong-e Pā’īn) is a village in Sarkhun Rural District, Qaleh Qazi District, Bandar Abbas County, Hormozgan Province, Iran. At the 2006 census, its population was 442, in 106 families.

References 

Populated places in Bandar Abbas County